The Maryland Renaissance Festival is a Renaissance fair located in Crownsville, Maryland. It is open from the last weekend of August and runs for nine weekends.

History 

In the early 1970s, Minnesota lawyer Jules Smith Sr. (1930–2018) invested in George Coulam's Minnesota Renaissance Festival. A few years later,  Coulam left the Minnesota festival and started the Texas Renaissance Festival, and Smith sold his shares in the Minnesota festival and organized a similar festival in Maryland, near Merriweather Post Pavilion in Columbia. The fair was first held for four weekends in 1977 and drew 17,000 people to see performances by Penn and Teller and The Flying Karamazov Brothers among others. In 1985, the fair was moved to its current location in Crownsville and in 1986 Smith turned over the management of the fair to his son Jules Smith Jr., who still runs the festival with three siblings. The festival was originally an Elizabethan fair, but in 1989 switched to being focused on Henry VIII of England. King Henry is played by actor Fred Nelson, replacing Bill Huttel, after Huttel's death in 2001.

On July 22, 2020, the Maryland Renaissance Festival announced that it would not operate in 2020 due to the COVID-19 pandemic.

Fair

There are more than 130 craft shops and 42 food outlets.

More than 1,300 participants populate the village, 400 work directly for the company, 700 for the other vendors and 200 as performers on stages or as characters throughout the village. The Maryland Renaissance Festival utilizes eight major theaters, four smaller stages in taverns, a children's area and a jousting tiltyard with seating for 3,000.

See also 

 List of Renaissance fairs

References

External links

 Official website

Renaissance Festival
Tourist attractions in Anne Arundel County, Maryland
1977 establishments in Maryland
Renaissance fairs
Festivals established in 1977